The RIAI Triennial Gold Medal has been awarded since 1934 to the best building completed in the preceding three years by a member of the Royal Institute of the Architects of Ireland.

Recipients

References 
 RIAI Gold Medal winners

 
Architecture in Ireland
Architecture awards